was a Japanese physician, pathologist and Emeritus Professor of Nippon Medical School in Tokyo. He was the founder or nite of the world's only known collection of tattoos taken from the dead.

Life
Fukushi Masaichi studied at the Tokyo Imperial University Medicine. After studying in Germany, he began in 1914 at the Medical college Kanazawa University Kanazawa. The focus of his research was initially that syphilis caused aortitis and thyroid disease. He became interested in tattoos when he noticed that the tattoo ink in the skin killed the skin lesions of syphilis. Fukushi Masaichi himself was not tattooed. 

His research on the subject of human skin (from 1907) brought him into contact with many people that had tattoos. He therefore became interested in 1926 in the art of Japanese tattoo (Irezumi), led autopsies on corpses, removed the skin and did research on methods to preserve the skin. In the following years he collected an archive of about 2000 "hides" and 3000 photographs which were lost in 1945, during World War II. 

Masaichi put some of his unique collection of tattooed hides and groomed skin that had been outsourced in the early 1940s in an air raid shelter. Since they were protected from the effects of war they survived the bombings. These skins are all that remains of his collection.

References

Bibliography 
 - Total pages: 240 
 - Total pages: 95 

 - Total pages: 271 

Japanese pathologists
1878 births 
1956 deaths
People from Yamaguchi Prefecture
Tattooing